Niraparib/abiraterone acetate is an experimental combination anti-cancer medication under investigation for the treatment of prostate cancer. It contains niraparib, a poly (ADP-ribose) polymerase (PARP) inhibitor (antineoplastic agent), and abiraterone acetate, a CYP17 inhibitor (hormone antagonist).

Society and culture

Legal status 
On 23 February 2023, the Committee for Medicinal Products for Human Use (CHMP) of the European Medicines Agency (EMA) adopted a positive opinion, recommending the granting of a marketing authorization for the medicinal product Akeega, intended for the treatment of adults with metastatic castration-resistant prostate cancer with BRCA 1/BRCA 2 mutations. The applicant for this medicinal product is Janssen-Cilag International N.V.

References 

Combination drugs
Cancer treatments
CYP17A1 inhibitors
Janssen Pharmaceutica
Johnson & Johnson brands
PARP inhibitors
Prostate cancer